Ronald Edwards (1 April 1917 – 26 February 2013) was a South African cricketer. He played twelve first-class matches for Northerns between 1939 and 1952.

References

External links
 

1917 births
2013 deaths
South African cricketers
Northerns cricketers
Cricketers from Pretoria